Italy competed at the 2011 World Aquatics Championships in Shanghai, China between July 16 and 31, 2011.

Medalists

Diving

Italy has qualified 9 athletes in diving.

Men

Women

Open water swimming

Men

Women

Mixed

Swimming

Italy qualified 26 swimmers.

Men

Women

Synchronised swimming

Italy has qualified 12 athletes in synchronised swimming.

Women

Water polo

Men

Team Roster 

Stefano Tempesti – Captain
Amaurys Perez
Niccolo Gitto
Pietro Figlioli
Alex Giorgetti
Maurizio Felugo
Niccolo Figari
Valentino Gallo
Christian Presciutti
Deni Fiorentini
Matteo Aicardi
Arnaldo Deserti
Giacomo Pastorino

Group D

Quarterfinals

Semifinals

Gold medal game

Women

Team Roster

Giulia Gorlero
Simona Abbate
Elisa Casanova – Captain
Francesca Pomeri
Martina Savioli
Allegra Lapi
Marta Colaiocco
Roberta Bianconi
Giulia Enrica Emmolo
Giulia Rambaldi Guidasci
Aleksandra Cotti
Teresa Frassinetti
Elena Gigli

Group D

Quarterfinals

Semifinals

Bronze medal game

References

Nations at the 2011 World Aquatics Championships
World Aquatics
Italy at the World Aquatics Championships